Suzanne Nora Johnson (born June 14, 1957) is an American corporate lawyer and executive. Until 2007, she was vice chairman of Goldman Sachs, chair of the Global Markets Institute, head of the firm's Global Investment Research Division, and a member of the firm's management committee.

Johnson joined Goldman Sachs in 1985 and became a partner in 1992. While at Goldman Sachs, she chaired the Pine Street/Goldman Sachs University board and served as a board member on the Goldman Sachs Foundation. Prior to joining the firm, Johnson was an attorney with Simpson, Thacher & Bartlett and worked as a law clerk on the United States Court of Appeals.

In July 2008, Johnson was appointed to the board of American International Group (AIG).

Johnson is lead independent director at Intuit and serves on the board of directors at Pfizer, and VISA.

Johnson is co-chair of the Brookings Institution and serves on the boards of several other nonprofit institutions: The Broad Museum, The Broad Foundation, the Carnegie Institution for Science, the Markle Foundation. On June 16, 2022, the University of Southern California announced Johnson was elected Chair of the Board of Trustees, replacing Rick Caruso  and making her the first womean to hold the position. A USC alumna, Johnson joined the USC Board of Trustees in 1998. She is an advisory board member to the Initiative on Financial Security at the Aspen Institute. Johnson is also a member of the Global Agenda Council for the Future of Financial and Monetary Systems for the World Economic Forum.  She served as chairman of the visiting committee for the Institute for Innovations at Southwestern Medical School at the Southwestern Medical School, University of Texas (2003, 2004) and as a member of the visiting committee at the Department of Embryology at the Carnegie Institution of Washington (2000, 2004) and Harvard Law School (2006).

Johnson earned her Juris doctor from Harvard Law and her Bachelor of Arts in interdisciplinary studies from the USC. Forbes ranked her at 34 on its 2006 list of "The World's 100 Most Powerful Women".

On June 16, 2022, USC announced Johnson has been elected Chair of the Board of Trustees, replacing Rick Caruso.

Honors and awards
She was American Academy of Arts and Sciences Fellow of 2019.

References

External links
Press release from Goldman Sachs

1957 births
20th-century American businesspeople
American corporate directors
American International Group people
American women lawyers
American lawyers
Corporate lawyers
Goldman Sachs people
Harvard Law School alumni
Harvard University staff
Living people
Lawyers from Chicago
Pfizer people
Simpson Thacher & Bartlett
University of Southern California alumni
20th-century American women
21st-century American women